The Santa Barbara Metropolitan Transit District (MTD) is a public transit agency providing bus service in the southern portion of Santa Barbara County, California. It serves the cities of  Santa Barbara,  Carpinteria, and Goleta as well as the unincorporated areas of Montecito, Summerland, and Isla Vista.

History 
Mule-powered street railways were implemented in 1875 and were gradually replaced by electric streetcars in 1896. The streetcars made their last run on July 1, 1929; about a month later, the Santa Barbara Transit Corporation company started providing local bus service (H.A. Spreitz, its owner, already operated another bus company that served the suburban areas of Goleta and Carpinteria.
In the late 1950s and 60s, Santa Barbara Transit was losing revenue, and repeatedly threatened to go out of business.
Strikes were also a problem, as the company could not afford to pay its employees.

At first, the City of Santa Barbara considered subsidizing the transit company, but since service was needed to Carpinteria and Goleta  as well, a transit district was thought to be a better choice, because it would also be able to levy taxes on separately.
Voters approved the formation of the MTD in 1966.

However, since the new district had no funds, bus service didn't start until 1967. 

Over the years, service has expanded, particularly on routes serving the University of California, Santa Barbara and Santa Barbara City College. Bus schedules were being distributed from 1983 onwards.

In August 2012 MTD implemented peak-hour commuter service (Coastal Express Limited) between Ventura and the Santa Barbara/Goleta area.

Route Lines 

All routes serving Downtown Santa Barbara begin and end at the Transit Center

Line 1: Westside 
This route serves Carrillo and San Andres on the west side of Santa Barbara. At the transit center, most Route 1 buses become Route 2.

Line 2: Eastside 
This route runs to East Santa Barbara via Anapamu and Milpas. Interlined with Route 1.

Line 3: Oak Park 
Operates between the Downtown Transit Center and La Cumbre Plaza via De La Vina (outbound) or Bath (inbound), Las Positas, and State St. Also serves Cottage Hospital and Adams Elementary School.

Lines 4 and 5: Mesa 
Line 5 operates between the Downtown Transit Center and La Cumbre Plaza via Cliff and Las Positas. Line 4 is a loop that operates between Santa Barbara City College and the Transit Center via Carillo and Cliff.

Serves Santa Barbara City College.

Line 6: State/Hollister/Goleta 
This route serves State Street in Santa Barbara and Hollister Ave. in Goleta.  It also serves San Marcos Senior High School.  Some trips continue as Line 23 or as Line 11.

Line 7: Calle Real 
Operates between Downtown Goleta (Hollister/Pine) and the Transit Center via Calle Real. Provides service to the County Health Care Services complex and Sansum Medical Complex on Foothill Rd.

Line 10: Cathedral Oaks 
Line 10 was suspended on April 6, 2020. Provides service between Hollister/Storke and La Cumbre Plaza via Cathedral Oaks. Limited service is provided (early morning and afternoon)

Line 11: State/Hollister/UCSB 
Like Route 6, starts from Downtown SB and continues via State Hollister, but then turns south on Fairview to serve the Santa Barbara Airport , University of California, Santa Barbara, and the Camino Real Marketplace.  Some trips continue as Line 25 and some continue as Line 6.

Together with Route 6, Route 11 forms the trunk of the SBMTD system.

Line 12x: State/Hollister/UCSB Express 
Uses the US-101 Freeway between Downtown Santa Barbara and Downtown Goleta, then continues on Hollister to Storke, where it interlines with Route 24.

Line 14: Montecito 
Route 14 connects Downtown Santa Barbara and the Eastside (Milpas St) with Montecito, looping via Olive Mill, San Ysidro, Sheffield and North Jameson.

Line 15x: SBCC/UCSB Express 
This route does double duty, serving Isla Vista commuters to Santa Barbara City College, then looping via the Mesa area (Cliff/Meigs) for passengers going to UCSB. No service is provided when either school is not in session.

Line 16: City College Shuttle 
Provides a quick trip between Downtown and the City College. Not in operation when SBCC is not in session.

Line 17: Westside/City College 
Connects Downtown Santa Barbara with SBCC via San Pascual.

Line 19: School Boosters 
Several short routes serving area schools. These typically provide one round trip per schoolday. These routes are open to the general public.

Line 20: Carpinteria 
Local service between Downtown Santa Barbara and Carpinteria via Eastside Santa Barbara, US-101 and Via Real. Also serves Coast Village Road and southern Montecito. It is the only bus that runs through Summerland.

Line 21x: Carpinteria Express 
Line 21x was discontinued on August 20, 2018. Like Route 20 above, but runs nonstop on US-101 between Downtown Santa Barbara and Carpinteria (no service to Montecito or Summerland). Peak hour weekday service, and some limited weekend service as well.

Line 22: Old Mission 
Line 22 was discontinued on August 24, 2014.  It formerly served the Santa Barbara Mission from Downtown, via Anapamu and Garden. On weekends, it served the Santa Barbara Botanic Garden on request (with a callbox available for passengers wanting bus service from the Garden).

Line 23: Winchester Canyon 
From the Camino Real Marketplace to the Winchester Canyon residential area north of US-101.

Line 24x: UCSB Express 
Nonstop service between Downtown Santa Barbara and UCSB, then via Isla Vista and Storke to Hollister, where it interlines with Route 12x. Additional service is provided when UCSB is in session.

Line 25: Ellwood 
From the Camino Real Marketplace to Ellwood – Winchester Canyon.

Line 27: UCSB Shuttle 
Provides additional service between UCSB and Hollister/Storke when UCSB is in session.

Line 36: Seaside Shuttle 
Line 36 was suspended on April 6, 2020. Loops around Carpinteria, with service provided to the northern areas of the city, as well as to the beach. Connects with Route 20 and 21x.

Downtown Waterfront Shuttle 
The Downtown Waterfront Shuttle was suspended on April 6, 2020. This is actually two routes. The Downtown route runs along State Street between Stearns Wharf and Sola St, near the Arlington Theater. The Waterfront route operates along Cabrillo between Santa Barbara Harbor and the Santa Barbara Zoo.

This route is partially subsidized by the City of Santa Barbara, and a reduced fare is charged.

Line 37: Crosstown Shuttle 
Line 37 was suspended on April 6, 2020. The Crosstown Shuttle operates between the Westside and Eastside via Micheltorena, Chapala (eastbound) or Anacapa (westbound) and Cota.

Calle Real/Old Town Shuttle 
Provides shuttle service between Old Town Goleta (Hollister) and the shopping areas on Calle Real, just north of the US-101 Freeway.

Coastal Express Limited 
This service has been discontinued. A weekday only commuter bus system linking Ventura with Goleta, and Santa Barbara funded in part by two freeway construction projects.

Fare structure

Contactless fare payment 
Some vehicles are equipped with a contactless fare reading device that allows customers to pay using a credit/debit/prepaid card or a mobile wallet on smart devices.

References

External links 
 Santa Barbara MTD homepage

Bus transportation in California
Public transportation in Santa Barbara County, California
Santa Barbara, California
Goleta, California
Montecito, California
Transit agencies in California
Summerland, California
1966 establishments in California